Urazmetovo (Üräźmät) is a rural locality (a selo) in Kysylsky Selsoviet, Alsheyevsky District, Bashkortostan, Russia. The population was 227 as of 2010. There are 6 streets.

Geography 
Urazmetovo is located 50 km southeast of Rayevsky (the district's administrative centre) by road. Fedoro-Petrovka is the nearest rural locality.

References 

Rural localities in Alsheyevsky District